The annulus, or annular space, is the space between a penetrant and whatever surrounds it, such as the sides of an opening or a sleeve, as the case may be.

External links
External examples of the use of the term.
 Annulus, a term used within a firestop patent
 Annulus, as used in UL System C-AJ-1557 Firestop System, Configuration A

Passive fire protection
Firestops